Jerry Oliver Wilkerson (September 5, 1942 in Texas – June 2, 2007) was a St. Louis, Missouri artist known for his contemporary pointillistic style of painting, and as a supporter of local business and talent.

Biography
After completing his BS at Lamar University in Beaumont, Texas, in 1966, Wilkerson obtained his MFA (1968) from Washington University in St. Louis.  He settled in St. Louis following military service in the Army from 1968 - 1970.  Wilkerson exhibited at galleries in St. Louis, Kansas City, New Orleans, New York City, and Carmel, California.  His works are represented in several public collections including the St. Louis Art Museum, the Baltimore Museum of Art, the Delaware Art Museum in Wilmington, the Tucson Museum of Art, and the Evansville Museum of Arts and Science in Evansville, Indiana. The major theme of his work is food — including lobsters, burgers, a Warholesque Campbell's Pork and Beans can, bananas, cherries, apples, pears, fortune cookies, and cups of coffee.  Wilkerson died of cancer at age 63.

References
St. Louis Art Museum. Jerry O. Wilkerson. (St. Louis, Art Museum, 1979) [solo exhibition catalogue] OCLC 29295224
Vital Records – Jefferson County, TX – Births 1943 (Names: Taiclet–Zerillo)
Jerry O. Wilkerson Painter's work has been exhibited nationally. St. Louis Post-Dispatch obituary, 7 June 2007.

External links
 St. Louis University Museum of Art. Discerning Palette: Jerry O. Wilkerson Retrospective, 2008. artist biography and exhibit brochure
Askart.com pages on Jerry O. Wilkerson
Askart.com: color images of Wilkerson's work
Artnet.com information on Wilkerson

1943 births
2007 deaths
People from Beaumont, Texas
Artists from St. Louis
Painters from Missouri
20th-century American painters
American male painters
21st-century American painters
Artists from Texas
Deaths from cancer in Missouri
Lamar University alumni
American contemporary painters
20th-century American male artists
Sam Fox School of Design & Visual Arts alumni